The Mutual Aid Union Building is a historic commercial building at 2nd and Poplar Streets in Rogers, Arkansas.  Designed by local architects William E. Matthews and A. O. Clarke and built in 1914, it is one of the region's finest Classical Revival buildings.  It is a two-story stone and brick building, with a prominent two-story portico supported by four large Roman columns.  The Mutual Aid Union, founded in 1907, was a mutual insurance company which sold policies organized into "circles" of 1,000, with dues-paying members making contributions based on their age.

The building was listed on the National Register of Historic Places in 1976.

See also
National Register of Historic Places listings in Benton County, Arkansas

References

Commercial buildings on the National Register of Historic Places in Arkansas
Neoclassical architecture in Arkansas
Buildings and structures completed in 1913
Buildings and structures in Rogers, Arkansas
1913 establishments in Arkansas
National Register of Historic Places in Benton County, Arkansas